A political pensioner enjoys a pension awarded due to his or political career or significance.

UK domestic politicians 

By the Political Offices Pension Act 1869, pensions were instituted for those who had held political office. For the purposes of the act, political offices were divided into three classes:
 those with a yearly salary of not less than £5,000; 
 those with a salary of less than £5,000 and not less than £2,000;
 those with a salary of less than £2,000 and more than £1,000.

For service in these offices there may be awarded pensions for life in the following scale: 
 a first class pension not exceeding £2,000 a year, in respect of not less than four years service or its equivalent, in an office of the first class; 
 a second class pension not exceeding £1,200, in respect of service of not less than six years or its equivalent, in an office of the second class; 
 a third class pension not exceeding £800 a year, in respect of service of not less than ten years in an office of the third class.

The service need not be continuous, and the act makes provision for counting service in lower classes as a qualification for pension in a higher class. These pensions are limited in number to twelve, but a holder must not receive any other pension out of the public revenue, if so, he must inform the treasury and surrender it if it exceeds his political pension, or if under he must deduct the amount. He may, however, hold office while a pensioner, but the pension is not payable during the time he holds office. To obtain a political pension, the applicant must file a declaration stating the grounds upon which he claims it and that his income from other sources is not sufficient to maintain his station in life.

Colonial

Other 

Similar 'golden cage' arrangements were often made later by other (not only British) governments. An extreme case was the French Emperor Napoleon Bonaparte, for whom the Italian island of Elba was turned into an operetta 'empire' until his escape, Hundred Days revolt and miserable banishment to St. Helena.

India 

Political pensioners were formerly reigning dynasties of Indian princely states that had been dethroned and their states annexed by British India under the doctrine of lapse.

Sources and references 

History of the British Empire
History of India
Pensions
Pensioners